= Ghat Khedi, Bhopal =

Ghat Khedi
- village
- Location within Madhya Pradesh Location within India
- Coordinates: 23.3248469°N 77.4318289°E
- Country: India
- State: Madhya Pradesh
- District: Bhopal
- Tehsil: Huzur
- Elevation: 483 m (1,585 ft)

Population (2011)
  - Total: 203
- Time zone: UTC+5:30 (IST)
- ISO 3166 code: MP-IN
- 2011 census code: 482457

Ghat Khedi is a village in the Bhopal district of Madhya Pradesh, India. It is located in the Huzur tehsil and the Phanda block. It is about 483 meters above sea level and is located in a rural area where people mainly depend on farming activities.

== Demographics ==
According to the 2011 census of India, Ghat Khedi has 37 households. The effective literacy rate (i.e. the literacy rate of population excluding children aged 6 and below) is 66.29%.

Demographics (2011 Census)
	Total	Male	Female
Population	203	112	91
Children aged below 6 years	25	13	12
Scheduled caste	9	7	2
Scheduled tribe	0	0	0
Literates	118	73	45
Workers (all)	125	71	54
Main workers (total)	106	67	39
Main workers: Cultivators	34	24	10
Main workers: Agricultural labourers	48	26	22
Main workers: Household industry workers	1	0	1
Main workers: Other	23	17	6
Marginal workers (total)	19	4	15
Marginal workers: Cultivators	9	2	7
Marginal workers: Agricultural labourers	10	2	8
Marginal workers: Household industry workers	0	0	0
Marginal workers: Others	0	0	0
Non-workers	78	41	37
